Hanina ben Pappa was a Jewish Talmudist living in the Land of Israel, halakhist, and aggadist who flourished in the 3rd and 4th centuries (third generation of amoraim).

His name is variously written "Ḥanina", "Hananiah", and "Ḥinena".

Biography
He was a younger contemporary of Samuel ben Nahman.

That he possessed great stores of learning is shown by the frequency with which he is cited in both Talmud and Midrash, and he enjoyed the companionship of the foremost teachers of his generation. He discussed exegetics with Shimon ben Pazi, and he was associated with Abbahu and Rabbi Isaac Nappaha on the judiciary.

It is told that Hanina was very charitable, and distributed his gifts at night so as not to expose the recipients to shame. But as the night is assigned to the evil spirits, his procedure displeased the latter. Once the chief of the spirits met him and asked, "Do you not teach the Biblical inhibition, 'You shall not remove your neighbor's landmark'? Why then do you invade my province?" Hanina answered, "Does not the Bible also teach, 'A gift in secret pacifies anger'?" thus reminding the spirit that no evil could befall him. On hearing this the spirit became disheartened and fled.

Hanina is reputed to have been providentially guarded against errors of judgment. Once he made a mistake in connection with a mourning, and in the succeeding night was corrected by a dream in which he heard the message, "You have disobeyed the mouth of the Lord".

It is told that Hanina had a friendship with the Angel of Death. When his time came to die, the angel came to inform Hanina. Hanina requested a 30-day delay in which to review his studies (in accordance with the saying "Happy is one who comes to [the World to Come] with his studies in his hand"). After 30 days, Hanina asked the angel to show him Hanina's place in the World to Come, and the angel agreed. Hanina then asked the angel to give him his knife, so as not to scare Hanina on the way. When the angel heard this, it remembered an incident where Rabbi Joshua ben Levi had similarly requested the knife, and then took the opportunity to escape. The angel therefore tried to push off the request, saying "Do you think you are on the level of Rabbi Joshua ben Levi?" The angel described an incident in which Joshua had shown his righteousness in a way Hanina had not, and Hanina was left without an answer. Nevertheless, when Hanina died, due to his greatness a pillar of fire appeared to separate his body from the living.

Teachings
Many of Hanina's aggadic teachings are recorded in the Talmud. In his public lectures Hanina frequently illustrated God's wisdom as manifested in nature, and expressed many eschatological thoughts. Starting with Isaiah 43:9 ("Let all the nations be gathered together, and let the people be assembled: who among them can declare this, and show us former things? let them bring forth their witnesses, that they may be justified"), he delivered the following homily, perhaps the longest and most connected of all aggadot:

References

 It has the following bibliography:
Bacher, Ag. Pal. Amor. ii. 513 et seq.;
Heilprin, Seder ha-Dorot, ii.

Talmud rabbis of the Land of Israel